was a Japanese track and field athlete. She competed in the women's discus throw and the women's javelin throw at the 1932 Summer Olympics.

References

External links
 

1914 births
Year of death missing
Japanese female shot putters
Japanese female discus throwers
Japanese female javelin throwers
Olympic female discus throwers
Olympic female javelin throwers
Olympic athletes of Japan
Athletes (track and field) at the 1932 Summer Olympics
Japan Championships in Athletics winners
20th-century Japanese women